Strawberries (Fragaria × ananassa) in the United States are almost entirely grown in California  86% of fresh and 98% of frozen in 2017  with Florida a distant second. Of that 30.0% was from Monterey, 28.6% from Ventura, 20.0% from Santa Barbara, 10.0% from San Luis Obispo, and 9.2% from Santa Cruz. The Watsonville/Salinas strawberry zone in Santa Cruz/Monterey, and the Oxnard zone in Ventura, contribute heavily to those concentrations.

Production has risen steadily from 2005 when  were harvested through 2017 when  were harvested. The 2005 season's harvest sold for $1,122,834,000. The 2017 harvest sold for $3,100,215,000.

The California Strawberry Commission is the Agriculture Department body which advocates for strawberry growers. The CSC provides information for both growers and consumers. Some towns have annual strawberry festivals, see . The Driscoll's company began with strawberries here and still grows and sells here; they have since expanded to other states, countries, and types of berries.

Economics and labor
Productivity routinely averages . In 2017 that resulted in a total of  worth $3,100,215,000.

Growers paid $12.60/hour on average to farmworkers. In 2005 Santa Maria was far below Oxnard and Salinas–Watsonville. By 2019 however Santa Maria had become the highest producing area in the state for both conventional and organic. In 2021  were harvested, almost all from the same three longstanding areas, Oxnard, Santa Maria, and Salinas–Watsonville. This requires  totalling 50-60,000 in the summer peak.

Pest management 

Regional Integrated Pest Management Centers (Regional IPM Centers) hosts a suggested IPM plan for strawberry.

, Cooperative Extension SB provides detailed recommendations and practices. For their cultivar recommendations see .

 there is increasing interest and increasing progress in automated (robotic) phytopathology in this crop, especially monitoring for insects and UV-C application for mites.

Diseases 

The use of soil fumigation was highly praised and widely recommended by the California Strawberry Advisory Board in 1967. Strawberry production here has been highly productive ever since but also highly dependent on fumigants. So vital was the most common fumigant  methyl bromide  that the ongoing phase out of the chemical has sent growers and researchers scrambling for alternatives. One alternative specifically for nematodes is 1,3-Dichloropropene, however some of the finely textured soils in some of the state's soil regions reduce its efficacy, and  there are restrictions in some townships on maximum rates. Soil solarization is another option. Stapleton et al., 2005 eliminate almost 100% of annual weeds in this crop with solarization alone. It completely fails against yellow nutsedge however.

Various strains of Botrytis cinerea are the most common and most impactful disease of this crop. Botrytis leaf spot was first discovered here. Conventional strawberry requires many fungicide sprays per season. Losses can commonly be 3040% if fungicides are not competently employed, or not permitted as with organic. If lower temperatures and high rain persist unusually long, such a control failure will cost 5060% of the yield  at this point the season is abandoned and 100% of revenue will be lost.

Strawberry crown rot is a major disease here as it is in any productive growing region. Genetic markers for CR resistance would make a significant difference in yield. Shaw et al., 2008 is a starting point for such screening, using the markers they found.

Daugovish et al., 2012 finds the introduction of drip irrigation has reduced asymptomatic Colletotrichum acutatum presence in nurseries, and thus lower anthracnose in the resulting transplants. See  and for a treatment see .

The only effective treatment of Fusarium Wilt may be genetic resistance. Fw1 is very likely to be a toll/interleukin-1 receptor (TIR) nucleotide-binding leucine-rich repeat (NB-LRR) gene. They also identify seven accessions which are fw1 (recessive susceptible homozygous) yet nonetheless resistant, and thus predicted to carry yet-unidentified novel genetics. See .

No cultivar has full resistance to Powdery Mildew, and the partial resistance that is available varies widely. Palmer & Holmes 2021 finds increasing resistance/declining efficacy to most of the most commonly applied ingredients, in Oxnard.

Pests 
Insects are a constant concern. The Beet Armyworm (BAW, Spodoptera frugiperda) skeletonizes leaves, damages crowns, and then begins eating the berries. BAW is especially a problem of the southern and Santa Maria strawberry zones, but can damage transplant crowns anywhere in the state. Egg deposition is most often in the fall. Overwintering is possible and will produce earlier and more severe infestations. BAW is controlled by a parasitoid wasp, Hyposoter exiguae, and by Spodoptera exigua nuclear polyhedrosis virus (SeNPV) but additional control may be needed. Insecticides during transplanting are needed sometimes in the southern areas, but sometimes not due to natural controls. A good part of control relies only on weed management in the surrounding area, depriving BAW of alternate hosts. Further control may be needed using insecticides including methoxyfenozide, spinetoram, Bacillus thuringiensis ssp. kurstaki, diazinon. Organic control requires all of the non-insecticide methods (aggressive weeding, wasps, virus) plus Bacillus thuringiensis ssp. aizawai or Entrust which contains spinosad.

The  is common here. Organochlorines were used until being replaced in the 1970s by carbamates and organophosphates. See .

 frameless|right
Lygus bugs are common pests here including the Western Tarnished Plant Bug (Lygus hesperus). A vacuum collector called the BugVac is often used for this pest in strawberry.

Birds have mixed effects on strawberries here. They both eat farmed fruits but also the insects that trouble them. Hedgerows attract birds, whether that is desirable or undesirable. In the Central Valley, farm hedgerows, treelines, and woodlands will have 2x–3x the number of species and 3x–6x the population size of birds than an unvegetated edge of a field.

Whatever the specific effect of birds upon strawberry fields, large hedgerows in this state do improve both the yield and quality of strawberries grown nearby versus those grown next to smaller hedges or grassy banks.

Weeds 
Yellow sweetclover (Melilotus officinalis L. Lam.), chickweed (Stellaria spp.), annual bluegrass (Poa annua Linnaeus), shepherd's purse (Capsella bursa-pastoris Linnaeus Medikus), crabgrass (various Digitaria spp.), spotted spurge (Euphorbia maculata Linnaeus Small), and yellow nutsedge are common annual weeds in strawberry.

Treatments 

UC IPM recommends pesticide selection criteria, resistance management strategies, application practices, and environmental considerations.

Fungicides are used many times per season. Captan is by far the most common, averaging 7.3 applications per season, pyraclostrobin 2.5, cyprodinil 2.3, fludioxonil 2.3, boscalid 1.8, fenhexamid 1.4, pyrimethanil 1.2, penthiopyrad 0.9, sodium tetraborohydrate decahydrate 0.8, fluxapyroxad 0.75, and there were rare uses of Polyoxin D, Neem Oil, Fluopyram, Banda de Lupinus albus doce, Trifloxystrobin, Bacillus subtilis, Reynoutria sachalinensis, Thiram, Streptomyces lydicus, Bacillus amyloliquefaciens, Thiophanate-methyl, Aureobasidium pullulans, Hydrogen dioxide, and Peroxyacetic acid. UCR recommends fungicides and resistance management guidelines.

The interests of nurseries and growers in maintaining fungicide efficacy necessitates coordination of their fungicide usage between them to slow resistance evolution.

So beneficial was fumigation in this crop that Ansel Adams and Nancy Newhall selected it as one of the great achievements of the University of California system to photograph for their centennial book. However, increasing legal restrictions have made alternatives financially more attractive, otherwise more attractive, or even just necessary. Methyl bromide, and then methyl bromide + chloropicrin, were the original fumigants which so impressed Adams & Newhall and this allowed great expansion of strawberries here. Over the next several decades this encouraged breeding to ignore disease resistance in preference to all other traits, and only recently has methyl bromide phaseout made resistance interesting again.

Anaerobic soil disinfestation doesn't work for weeds in this crop, but ASD combined with rice bran is a good alternative to methyl bromide and other soil fumigants for microbial diseases including Verticillium dahliae.

Breeding 

The Davis campus is a major hub of strawberry breeding in the state, and indeed in the world. The Knapp group is a large part of strawberry biology study at the university, including the breeding program  of which Knapp himself is the director. UCD's varieties may be licensed from ITC. From 1986 Douglas Shaw headed the program, and starting in 1991 Kirk Larson co-headed with him. In 2013 they attempted to negotiate a retirement arrangement in which they would start their own breeding company, licensing UCD's patented varieties. UCD initially agreed but, anticipating the loss of revenue from what would essentially be a spin-off, reversed themselves. UCD countersued, alleging they had walked away with (stolen) unreleased germplasm and various other intellectual property violations. A civil trial resulted and, although CBC rapidly lost ground, the judge suggested that UCD would also be examined and face some consequences if the trial were to proceed. UCD and CBC settled with CBC forgoing $2.5 million in future royalties.

Other strawberry species (Fragaria spp.) are commonly used in breeding, including F. vesca the Woodland Strawberry. The UCD program is no exception and its genetic analyses also are used around the world by geneticists, other researchers, and breeders.

The analysis of Pincot et al., 2018 incidentally identifies a likely bottleneck in UCD's germplasm beginning in 1975.

CalPoly Strawberry Center does not operate a breeding program of its own. Instead the SC screens the varieties that come out of all of the state's breeding programs for disease resistance.

Driscoll's has its own private breeding program.

Day-neutrality is necessary to cultivation in some of the state's growing zones. 
F. virginiana ssp. glauca's day-neutrality was introgressed into F. xananassa and first released in 1979 varieties.

Cultivars 
UC IPM lists and describes the most commonly grown varieties of strawberry here.

UC Davis's Innovation and Technology Commercialization office licenses and sub-licenses all cultivars created by the entire University system. These are:

For Santa Barbara County specifically, Cooperative Extension SB recommends overlapping with two cultivar groups: Short-day and day-neutral. For short day they suggest cvs. 'Benicia', 'Camarosa', 'Camino Real', 'Chandler', 'Mojave', and/or 'Ventana'. For day-neutral, cvs. 'Albion', 'Monterrey', 'San Andrés', and/or 'Seascape'.

 twelve nurseries are licensed to propagate UCD varieties: Cal, Cedar Point, Crown, Innovative Organic, Jacobsen Pacific, Larse, Lassen Canyon, Monte Vista, Mountain Valley, NorCal, Planasa, and Sierra-Cascade.

cv. 'Camino Real' produces heavily in the Central Coast. 'CR' yields over  more than cv. 'Chandler', and berries average 27 grams vs. 21 grams, in Fresno County.

From the introduction of methyl bromide in late 1950s to the beginning of phaseout in the late 1990s, MB's great effectiveness encouraged breeders to ignore soilborne disease resistance in preference to all other traits. Now, especially with the end of all methyl bromide use outside of nurseries in December 2016, resistance has become interesting again. There is indeed a wide range of resistance to soilborne pathogens in existing cultivars and these resistances can be quite effective.

Varieties bred here tie with Mediterranean varieties for the most inbred in the world, due to intense breeding specifically for this market.

Florida's industry commonly uses varieties originated here. Turkey's modern strawberry industry was begun from California varieties, and still relies heavily on varieties bred here, along with Florida varieties and some from Australia.

Testing
UCD's Foundation Plant Services performs disease testing (especially for viruses), variety identification testing, and supplies tissue or plants for propagation material.

References

Agriculture in California
Strawberry production